Ahmed Yasser Anwar Mohamed Mohamed Rayyan (born 24 January 1998) is an Egyptian professional footballer who plays as a striker for Egyptian premier league club Ceramica Cleopatra. He is the son of former Egypt international footballer Yasser Rayyan.

Honours
Al Ahly
Egyptian Premier League: 2017–18
CAF Champions League: 2020–21

Egypt U23
Africa U-23 Cup of Nations: 2019

References

1998 births
Living people
Egyptian footballers
Association football forwards
Al Ahly SC players
El Gouna FC players
Egypt international footballers
Footballers from Cairo
Footballers at the 2020 Summer Olympics
Olympic footballers of Egypt
21st-century Egyptian people